Harold Seeger (May 16, 1917 – March 13, 2005) was an American animated cartoon producer and director who owned his own studio the Hal Seeger Studio (Hal Seeger Productions). He is most famous as the creator of the 1960s animated series Batfink, Milton the Monster and Fearless Fly. During the 1930s and 1940s he was also active as a comics writer and artist, most famously for the Betty Boop comic strip and Leave It to Binky.

Biography

Born in Brooklyn, New York, Seeger began working as an animator for Fleischer Studios in the early 1940s. His credits included "A Kick in Time" for the Color Classics series and a sequence for the feature film Mr. Bug Goes to Town.

During the later part of the 1940s, he worked as a screenwriter for a series of movies featuring well known Black performers, including the 1947 Cab Calloway musical Hi-De-Ho and two films featuring Dusty Fletcher and Moms Mabley, Killer Diller and Boarding House Blues".
In 1950 he wrote and directed a Warner Bros. short subject Hands Tell the Story featuring a story told with only human hands.

In 1962, his studio produced and syndicated 100 new Out of the Inkwell cartoons, based on the Koko the Clown character, originally created by Fleischer Studios.
Seeger then took control of animating the opening & ending sequences for The Porky Pig Show in 1964.

He is best known for having produced the animated programs Milton the Monster (1965–66) and Batfink (1966–67). He also produced Fearless Fly (1965), the adventures of a bumpkin fly who is physically helpless and practically blind without his trademark oversize rectangular glasses, but on putting them on he is invincible. This cartoon was a feature of The Milton the Monster Show.

Production list
 Out of the Inkwell
 Muggy-Doo
 Batfink
 The Porky Pig Show
 The Milton the Monster Show (1965–66)
 Popeye Meets the Man Who Hated Laughter (1972)

References

External links
 
 Fearless Fly at Don Markstein's Toonopedia

Animators from New York (state)
American animated film directors
American animated film producers
Television producers from New York City
American comics writers
American comics artists
1917 births
2005 deaths
Fleischer Studios people